Rogier Marinus Molhoek (born 22 July 1981) is a Dutch former professional footballer who played as a midfielder. He currently works as a youth coach at NAC Breda.

Club career
Molhoek previously played several years for Dordrecht '90, RKC Waalwijk, AZ, Vitesse and VVV-Venlo. He had emerged as a talented defensive midfielder at RKC, and was signed by AZ in January 2006 on a four-and-a-half year contract in a move, which saw Danny Mathijssen move the other way on loan. His time in Alkmaar was, however, marked by injuries and he struggled to establish himself in the starting lineup. After loans at NAC Breda and Vitesse, he signed a permanent two-and-a-half year deal with the latter on 14 January 2009 with Julian Jenner making the same move.

Molhoek signed his last professional contract with FC Dordrecht in July 2012. On 8 April 2013, Molhoek announced his retirement from professional football, returning to his youth club SHO in his hometown Oud-Beijerland, after the season. Due to a lingering ankle injury, Molhoek was no longer able to continue playing professionally. He would also join the coaching staff of the youth department of Dordrecht. He retired from SHO in early 2015 due to injuries.

International career
Molhoek gained three caps for the Netherlands under-21 team, making his debut on 6 September 2002 in the 0–1 loss to Belarus. He also appeared as team captain of the U21s.

Coaching career
In February 2015, he became assistant coach of the Dordrecht first team. In March 2017, he became a part of the NAC Breda youth department, initially coaching the U17 team. He was promoted to assistant coach of the NAC first team in January 2020 under head coach Peter Hyballa, before stepping down from the position on his own initiative on 10 February, instead choosing to coach the U17 team again. From the 2020–21 season, Molhoek formed a coaching duo together with Michael Dingsdag of the U18 team, after the U19 team of NAC was dissolved.

References

External links
 

1981 births
Living people
Dutch footballers
Eredivisie players
RKC Waalwijk players
AZ Alkmaar players
FC Dordrecht players
NAC Breda players
SBV Vitesse players
VVV-Venlo players
Eerste Divisie players
People from Oud-Beijerland
Association football midfielders
Netherlands under-21 international footballers
Dutch football managers
NAC Breda non-playing staff
Footballers from South Holland
21st-century Dutch people